John Lever is an English cricketer.

John Lever may also refer to:
John Lever, drummer of The Chameleons
John Orrell Lever, English shipping owner and politician
Johnny Lever, Indian actor and comedian
John Lever (MP for Calne), see Calne (UK Parliament constituency)